George Vishnu is an Indian actor who has worked on Tamil-language films and in television dramas.

Career
George Vishnu, the son of Malaysian Tamil actor Ravichandran and Malayalam actress Sheela, was chosen by producer Bhaskar to debut in a film titled Kadhal Rojavae in 1997. According to the deal signed, he was not supposed to act in any other film until Kadhal Rojavae had been completed and released. However, during production, Vishnu could not wait and starred in a Malayalam film, while Director Keyaar was still shooting, causing a rift between the actor and producer Bhaskar during the making of the project. The film, which featured him alongside Pooja Kumar, subsequently had a release after a delay in production in 2000.

The failure of the film meant that he instead chose to portray characters in television serials, and appeared intermittently in Tamil films including the serial Chellamay (2004) and Theeya Velai Seiyyanum Kumaru (2013).

Filmography

Serials
 Veetuku Veedu Looty (Jaya TV)
 2003-2004 Sahana as Akash (Jaya TV)
 2005 Chelvi as Vijay (Sun TV)
 2005-2006 Malargal as Moorthy (Sun TV)
 2007 Megala  (Sun TV)
 2008 Boys vs Girls (Star Vijay)
 2009-2010 Chellamay (Sun TV)
 2016 Vinnaithaandi Varuvaayaa (Star Vijay)

References

External links
 

Indian male film actors
Tamil male actors
Male actors from Chennai
Living people
Year of birth missing (living people)
Male actors in Tamil cinema
Male actors in Malayalam cinema